The 2021 Liga 3 Maluku would be the sixth editions of Liga 3 (formerly known as Liga Nusantara) as a qualifying round for the national round of 2021–22 Liga 3.

PS Hatusela Mamala were the defending champion but they are not participating in this season.

Teams
There are 10 teams participated in the league this season.

Group stage

Group A

Group B

Knockout stage

Semi final

Third place play-off

Final

Top goalscorer

References

Liga 3
Sport in Maluku (province)